Modesto Seara Vázquez «Allariz, September 11, 1931» jurist and academic mexican, has lived in several countries (Spain, England, France, Germany) but has spent most of his life in Mexico. He has actively participated in Mexican life as a professor at the National Autonomous University of Mexico and since 1988 as the Rector of the Oaxaca State University System in the State of Oaxaca.

Early years 
Modesto Seara Vazquez experienced the political persecution to which his father was subjected by the Franco regime, a situation which was surely decisive in defining his political vocation and position for international issues, because the surveillance of his home in the run-up to the Second World War left him marked with that passion forever.

In 1950 he went to Madrid to prepare for his Aeronautical Engineering degree. Shortly afterwards he discovered his true vocation, which was the study of international issues, and he moved on to the law degree. He studied at the Faculty of Law of the Central University of Madrid (today Complutense University), being among the last generation to study at Calle de San Bernardo, before the faculty was transferred to the University City.

Education 
 Doctorate  in International Law. University of Paris «The Sobornne», 1959
B.A. Central University, today Complutence University of Madrid, 1955
Diploma in Sociology «Methods of Study of Social Attitudes», Jaime Balmes Institute of the CSIC, Spain, 1955 
Diploma of Higher International Studies, Spanish Association of International Colonial Studies, Madrid 1955

His doctoral thesis, entitled «Études de Droit Interplanetaire», provoked a lot of interest and Le Figaro Literaire dedicated a long report written by Beatrix Beck, Goncourt Literature Prize, to support the thesis. Radio Paris also broadcast a series of interviews with Modesto Seara Vazquez entitled «The Interplanetary Law Seen from Paris». As a result, he was invited to present a paper at the Congress of the International Astronautical Federation (London 1959) in which he enunciated his theory of the functional regulation of space, later published in Vienna (1960), and which would be assumed by the majority of jurists.

Academic activities 

 First travel to Mexico

On 1 March 1961 he began his collaboration with the National Autonomous University of Mexico, as a full-time research professor at the Institute of Comparative Law, now the Institute of Legal Research.  At the same time he began to collaborate with the Faculty of Law and the School of Political and Social Sciences (now the Faculty of Social and Political Sciences) holding the chairs of Public International Law and International Organization.

In 1961 he published his first book «Introduction to International Cosmic Law», a revised and updated edition of his doctoral thesis, that years later was translated into English. In 1963, part of the thesis was also published in Russian, in Moscow.  

In Paris, Modesto Seara Vazquez met a great figure of Mexican life, Isidro Fabela, who was introduced to him by the military advisor of the Mexican Embassy, General Alberto Salinas Carranza, one of the founders of Mexican aviation. Isidro Fabela was traveling to Europe with his wife Doña Josefina. The advanced age of both made them fear to travel alone so they decided to bring with them Modesto Seara Vazquez. Isidro Fabela's friendship was decisive in the life of Modesto Seara Vazquez, since it opened many doors and integrated him quickly into the life of the country.

In that first decade of the 1960, Modesto Seara Vazquez had a very active academic life at National Autonomous University of Mexico, where he published a book on outer space law «Cosmic International Law» and a text on Public International Law, which would expand to 25 editions by 2016. All the editions of his books are subject to an update by him before he authorizes its publication.

 Stay in the United States

From 1965 to 1966 he was Professor at the University of Utah, Salt Lake City, in an extremely enriching stay, where he lived with the essentially Mormon community of the State of Utah, one of the last theocracies in the Western world. In spite of his political ideas, different from those prevailing in that environment, he always had the respect of his hosts. While having different vacation periods, he got to know the whole western part of the United States and traveled frequently through the states of Utah, California, Arizona, Nevada, Idaho, Montana, Oregon and Washington. He also visited British Columbia, in Canada, where he stayed briefly in Vancouver.

 The Struggle for Jewish Rights in the Soviet Union

Modesto Seara Vazquez joined an international movement in favor of the Jews of the Soviet Union, as part of the Latin American Committee, defending «the right to leave». For more than two decades, he participated in many countries in different activities like lectures, seminars, conferences, etc. In October 1973, during the Yon Kippur war, he visited the USSR as part of a commission of four people that were sent to meet Jews who were denied an exit visa. That Commission visited Moscow, Kiev, Tbilisi and Leningrad.

 One year in Europe

In 1969 Modesto Seara Vazquez decided to spend his sabbatical year in Europe, half of it in Spain and the other part in Berlin (West) where he carried out research on Franco's foreign policy, using the bibliographic and periodical collections of the Ibero-Amerikanisches Institut, in Berlin. During this period he also gave lectures in East Germany at the Karl Marx Universität, from Leipzig and Universität Rostock.

The journalistic dimension: press and television 
In the 70's he combined his academic activities with an intense participation in the Press and the Media. In «El Sol de México» he wrote editorial comments and several special articles, also on sundays he wrote the Sunday supplement in «El Mundo desde el Sol» which was a weekly commentary about the international life with a little bit of humor. He was appointed general advisor of «Canal 13 TV (public television)» where he also wrote weekly comments about the international life in the «Séptimo día» program. A part from that he created a series of international reports named «Paz y Conflicto» which programs were The Impossible Peace (on the Middle East), April in Portugal (the carnation Revolution, in Lisbon, Portugal), They Will Not Kill Hope (about Chilean political life and the death of Salvador Allende), the New Empire (about the last years of the Iran of Shah Reza Pahleví), and so on.

Oaxaca State Universities 

 The theoretical phase

In 1983, Modesto Seara Vazquez decided to abandon politics and return to university life, working at the National Autonomous University of Mexico. They were several years of an intense academic activity, both national and internacional where he increased his publications publishing new books and new editions, as well as essays. He runs the Mexican Yearbook of International Relations that he founded in 1980. In 1967 he created the Mexican Institute of Internacional Relations that years later was changed to The Mexican Association of International Studies.

In 1989 he was elected Vice President of the International Studies Association (ISA). At the ISA-MAIE meeting held in Acapulco, Guerrero, he concluded his term as president of MAEI and he was elected Honorary President of the Association.

In 1989 he was named National Researcher Emeritus, of the National System of Researchers of CONACYT.

 The practical phase, making utopia a reality

1988 was a decisive year of Modesto Seara Vazquez's life. In that year the governor of the state of Oaxaca asked him to create a project to build a university in Huajuapan de León, in the mixtec region, in the north of the state. Modesto Seara Vazquez developed the project and it officially began a new model of universities, that are conceived as universities for development. The definition he gave to this model of university was in the sense of transcending its educational function, and understanding it as a cultural instrument to transform society. He gave it four main functions: teaching, research, dissemination of culture and promotion of development.

The Technological University of the Mixteca opened doors in 1990, with 48 students, five professors and two classrooms, in the middle of a land baptized by local humorists as "the Seara Desert". It was the beginning of a great adventure that led to an unprecedented academic university project. In 2019, The Techonlogical University of the Mixteca has around 220 full-time research professors and about 1,800 students. It offers 12 bachelor and engineering degrees, 15 masters Degree programs, five PhD Degree programs, and it has nine research Institutes, within 109-hectare campus with more than 100 buildings.

As a result, the students of the Technological University of the Mixteca routinely rank among the top nationally (according to CENEVAL's General Knowledge Exams), in the fields of computer engineering, electronics, industrial or business sciences. In 2008 and 2011, a group of students achieved first place in the world in HCI (Human Computar Interaction, ACM), in the finals that took place in Florence and Atlanta and they were also number two in the same competition (Human Computar Interaction, ACM), first time in San Jose, California in 2017 and the second time in Paris, in 2013.

Academic institutions 

 President of the Mexican Association of International Studies, from 1967 to 1968 and from 1982 to 1993. Honorary president since 1993
Vice president of the International Studies Association, (ISA), from 1989 to 1991
Member of the Ad Hoc Committee on the International Geosphere/Biosphere Program (ISA), participating with Oran Young (U. Vermont), Harold Jacobsen (U. Michigan), Mihaly Simai (Magyar Ensz Tarsasag) and Denis Pirages (U. Maryland), 1986
Visiting professor at the University of Utah, Salt Lake City, from 1965 to 1966
Founding Head of the División de Estudios de Posgrado at the National Autonomous University of Mexico, from 1967 to 1960
Founding Head of the Center for International Relations at the National Autonomous University of Mexico, from 1970 to 1973
Full Professor at El Colegio de México, 1967
Full Professor of at the Law Faculty of the National Autonomous University of Mexico, from 1961 to 1967
Founding Head of the Mexican Yearbook of International Relations, from 1980 to 1987
Full Professor of the Faculty of Political and Social Sciences at the National Autonomous University of Mexico, from 1961 to 2012
Member of the Specialized Group for Special Activities at the National Autonomous University of Mexico, 1987
Steering Committee Member of the Academic Council on the United Nations System (ACUNS), 1989
Member of the Mexican National Committee for the Fiftieth Anniversary of the United Nations, 1995

Books 

 Around the World in 80 Years. Volumen I 1931-1976. First English Edition. Seara Vázquez, Modesto. Huatulco:UMAR, June 2020, pp. 430
 The Decisive Hour. English translation of the Spanish 3rd Edition (1995). Universidad del Mar, Huatulco, Mexico pp. 330
 Un Nuevo Modelo de Universidad. Universidades para el Desarrollo. 3rd Edition. Universidad Tecnológica de la Mixteca. Huajuapan de León, Oaxaca. pp. 336
 La Vuelta al Mundo en 80 Años, Vol. I, Huatulco: UMAR, 2016, pp. 427
 Derecho Internacional Público, 25th. Edition, Mexico: Porrúa, 2016, pp, 1003
 Después de la Tragedia. A 70 años de la Segunda Guerra Mundial. Seara Vázquez, Modesto and Lozano Vázquez, Alberto, Editors. Huatulco: UMAR, 2015, pp. 806. Author of the presentation, pp. 14–16 and author of the chapter I "La Última Guerra Mundial", pp. 17–86
 Novaya Model Universiteta. Seara Vázquez, Modesto and Igor Libin, Tatiana Oleinik, Evgueni Treiguer and Pérez Peraza, Jorge. Universiteti Rasvitia Opit Dlya Rossii, Moskvá: Mesdunarodnaya Akademia Otsenki and Konsultinga, 2012, pp. 433
 Bolonski Prozess Perspectivialy Rossii. Modesto Seara Vázquez and alia, Moskva, Miesdunarodnaya Akademia Otsenki i Konsaltinga, 2012, pp. 226
 La Sociedad Internacional Amorfa. Soluciones inadecuadas para problemas completos. Seara Vázquez, Modesto, Coordinator. Mexico and Huajuapan de León: UNAM and UMAR, 2011, pp. 654. Author of the Introduction, pp. 11–13 and Chapter I, "Un Mundo Convulso", pp. 17–58
 Vento de Queixuras, Mexico, 2011, pp. 94
 Un Nuevo Modelo de Universidad. Universidades para el desarrollo. 3rd. Edition, Huajuapan de León: UTM, 2019, pp. 312
 A New Model of University. Universities for Development. Updated version of the 1st. Spanish edition, Huajuapan de León: UTM, 2010, pp. 269
 La Organización de Naciones Unidas a los cincuenta años. (Editor), México: FCE, 1995, pp. 456. Author of the foreword and introduction «La Organización de Naciones Unidas: diagnóstico y tratamiento», pp. 7–39
 La Hora Decisiva, 3rd Edition., Mexico: Joaquín Mortiz: Planeta, 1995, pp. 417
 Una Nueva Carta para las Naciones Unidas, Huajuapan de León: UTM, 1993, pp. XXVII-80
 A New Charter for the United Nations. Huajuapan de León: UTM, 2004, pp. 357. Updated and modified English version of the previous one
 Tratado General de la Organización Internacional,  2nd. Edition. First Reprint. Mexico: FCE, 1985, pp. 1103
 Política Exterior de México, 3rd Edition. Mexico: Harla, 1985, pp. 414.
 Derecho y Política en el Espacio Cósmico, 2nd. Edition, Mexico: UNAM, 1982, pp. 169
 Mekishiko No-Gaikoseisaku (japanese modified version of La Política Exterior de México); Editor. Koyosobo, Kyoto, 1980, pp. 232
 Del Congreso de Viena a la Paz de Versalles, 2nd. Edition, Mexico: Porrúa, 1980, pp. 417
 La Paz Precaria. De Versalles a Danzig, 2nd. Edition., Mexico: UNAM, 1980, pp. 512
 El Socialismo en España, Mexico: UNAM, 1980 pp. 326
 La Sociedad Democrática, Mexico: UNAM, 1978, pp. 184
 Paz y Conflicto en la Sociedad Internacional, Mexico: UNAM, 1969, pp. 410
 Cosmic International Law, Detroit: Wayne State University Press, 1965, pp. 293
 Introducción al Derecho Internacional Cósmico, Mexico: UNAM, 1961, XV-314
 Études de Droit Interplanetaire, PhD thesis. mimeogr. Paris, 1959

Articles 

 El estado de preguerra, memoir presented (mimeographed) to the Spanish Society for International and Colonial Studies, (Madrid), 1954
 The Functional Regulation of the Extra-atmospheric Space, in Second Colloquium on the Law of Outer space, London 1959, Springer  Verlag, Wien, 1960, pp. 139–146
 El problema del Espacio Cósmico en las Naciones Unidas, in Revista de Ciencias Políticas y Sociales (RCPS), Number 22, 1960, pp. 569–576
 Guía bibliográfica sobre el espacio cósmico.  Aspectos jurídicos y políticos, in Revista de Ciencias Políticas y Sociales. Number 22, 1960, pp.  577–587
 El Congo. La Tragedia de un pueblo, in Cuadernos Americanos (CA), Number 3, 1961, pp. 7–37
 Los países del Consejo de la Entente Africana, in Revista de Ciencias Políticas y Sociales, Number 25, 1961, pp. 1–17
 El pensamiento y la contribución de Don Isidro Fabela al derecho internacional, in Cuadernos Americanos, Number 5, 1961, pp. 71–88
 La ley número 5710 de Israel castigo a los nazis y sus colaboradores, in Boletín del Instituto de Derecho Comparado de México (BIDCM), Number 42,  Vol. 23 1961, pp. 651–654
 Comentarios a la Conferencia de Viena sobre Relaciones e Inmunidades Diplomáticas, in Revista de la Facultad de Derecho de México (RFDM), Numbers 43 and 44, 1961, pp. 787–808
 Aspectos jurídicos del reconocimiento por medio de satélites, in Boletín del Instituto de Derecho Comparado de México, Number 43 1962, pp. 75–89
 El individuo ante las jurisdicciones internacionales, en la práctica actual, in Comunicaciones mexicanas al VI Congreso Internacional de Derecho Comparado, of Hamburg 1962, National University, Mexico, 1962, pp. 219–232
 La evolución del problema del desarme, in Mirador Cultural, Universidad Iberoamericana. Mexico, Number 1, 1962, pp. 123–137
 La evolución reciente del problema del espacio cósmico en las Naciones Unidas, in Revista de Ciencias Políticas y Sociales, Number 33, 1963, pp. 323–338
 Guía de lecturas para el estudiante de Ciencias Diplomáticas, in Revista de Ciencias Políticas y Sociales, 1963, pp. 7–30
 España a la hora de Europa. Examen y balance de una situación, in Cuadernos Americanos, Number. 2, 1963, pp. 7–30
 El principio de utilizaciones pacíficas del espacio extra-atmosférico, in Il Diritto Aereo (Roma), Number 8,1963, pp. 3–38
 Otvetstvennost y miedunarodnom kosmicheskobo prava, in Sovremenic problemi kosmicheskovo prava, Moscow, 1963, pp. 33–341
 El mundo en transición: I, Análisis del conflicto entre China y la URSS, in Cuadernos Americanos, Number 3,1964
 El mundo en transición: II, La coexistenica pacífica, in Cuadernos Americanos, Number 4, 1964
 El mundo en transición: III, El fin del maniqueísmo internacional, in Cuadernos Americanos, Number 5, 1964
 La IX Reunión de Consultation des Ministres des Affaires Etrangères et l'Affaire de Cuba, in Annuaire Francais de Droit International, 1964, Paris, 1965, pp. 638–653. (In spanish in Revista de la Facultad de Derecho de México, 1965)
 Dictamen jurídico sobre la crisis dominicana, in Mañana, Mexico, July 3, 1965. (Reproduced in several publications)
 Síntesis del Derecho Internacional Público, in Panorama del Derecho Mexicano, National University, Mexico, 1965, Vol. II, pp. 521–596 (also published as a separate brochure)
 Los propósitos y funciones del Instituto de Derecho Comparado, in Boletín del Instituto de Derecho Comparado de México, Number 53, 1965, pp. 353–359
 La política exterior de los Estados Unidos, in Cuadernos Americanos, Number 3, 1966, pp. 7–34
 Los conflictos de la ley nacional con los tratados internacionales, in Comunicaciones mexicanas al VII Congreso Internacional de Derecho Comparado, Upsala 1966, National University, Mexico, 1966, pp. 113–130
 La urgencia como elemento de la legítima defensa en derecho internacional, in Boletín del Instituto de Derecho Comparado de México, Number 55, 1966, pp. 81–98
 La política exterior de México, in Revista de Ciencias Políticas y Sociales, Number 40,1967, pp. 195–310
 Las reformas a la Carta de las Naciones Unidas, in Revista Española de Derecho Internacional (Madrid), 1968, pp. 43Z-448, special publication "Homenaje a la memoria de Don. Antonio de Luna"
 Teoría de las zonas de influencia, in Revista Mexicana de Ciencia Política (RMCP), 1971, pp. 25–32
 Humanidad y satélites: economía política y derecho, in Diálogos, May–June, 1971, pp. 26–29
 Reconocimiento de China por Canadá e Italia in Boletín del Centro de Relaciones Internacionales (BCRI), Number 1, 1970, pp. 24–25
 La Muerte de Gaulle, in Boletín del Centro de Relaciones Internacionales, Number 1, 1970, pp. 25–26
 La nueva diplomacia mexicana, in Boletín del Centro de Relaciones Internacionales, Number 4, 1971, pp. 1–5
 El problema del Oriente Medio, in Boletín del Centro de Relaciones Internacionales, Number 5, 1971, pp. 1–3
 Pactos ejecutivos y el régimen constitucional de México, in Boletín del Centro de Relaciones Internacionales, Number 5, 1971, pp. 47–49. (In collaboration)
 Les rélations du Mexique avec les Amériques in Le Monde Diplomatique, May 1971
 Errare humanum est, perseverare, etc., etc., o el dilema de la política asiática de los EE.UU., in Boletín del Centro de Relaciones Internacionales, Number 6, 1971, pp. 18–24
 La política exterior de México respecto a América Latina, in Boletín del Centro de Relaciones Internacionales, Number 7, 1971, pp. 73–81
 Las pruebas atómicas de Francia en el Pacífico, in Boletín del Centro de Relaciones Internacionales, Number 8, 1971, pp. 46–49
 Los mitos que se derrumban, in Boletín del Centro de Relaciones Internacionales, Number 9, 1971, pp. 8–14
 Inglaterra ¿es todavía una isla? in Boletín del Centro de Relaciones Internacionales, Número 9, 1971, pp. 39–41
 El derecho de irse, in Boletín del Centro de Relaciones Internacionales, Number 10, 1971, pp. 14
 Una nueva organización internacional: el Foro del Pacífico del Sur, in Boletín del Centro de Relaciones Internacionales, Number 10, 1971, pp. 6–8
 México y la República Popular China, in Boletín del Centro de Relaciones Internacionales, Number 10,1971, pp. 75–79
 La política exterior de México, in Pensamiento Político, October, 1971, pp. 167–192
 La nueva estructura de la sociedad Internacional, in Boletín del Centro de Relaciones Internacionales, Number 11, 1971
 El desenlace del problema chino, in Boletín del Centro de Relaciones Internacionales, Number 12, 1971, pp. 4–8
 La política exterior de México en el umbral de una nueva época, en el umbral de una época, in México hoy, Number - December, 1971, pp. 2, 10-11
 Fuerza militar y poder político en el plano internacional, in Boletín del Centro de Relaciones Internacionales, Number 12,1971, pp. 1–3
 Algunos errores al juzgar la política exterior de México, in Boletín del Centro de Relaciones Internacionales, Number 16, 1972, pp. 1–6
 España: Anverso y Reverso, in Boletín del Centro de Relaciones Internacionales, Number 17, 1972, pp. 1–18
 Israel y los países árabes, veinticuatro años después, in Boletín del Centro de Relaciones Internacionales, Number 18, may, 1972, pp. 1–14
 El conflicto del Alto Adigio; orígenes, evolución y solución, in Boletín del Centro de Relaciones Internacionales, Number 18, 1972, pp. 61–64
 América Latina en el mundo multipolar y de la Comunidad Económica Europea ampliada, in Boletín del Centro de Relaciones Internacionales, Number 20, 1972, pp. 1–15
 El regionalismo internacional, in Boletín del Centro de Relaciones Internacionales, Number 21, 1972, pp. 1–5
 Las plumas de la paz, in Boletín del Centro de Relaciones Internacionales, Number 22, 1972, pp. 1–8.
 El derecho de veto del tercer mundo en el Consejo de Seguridad, in Boletín del Centro de Relaciones Internacionales, Number 24, 1972, pp. 1–3
 El triunfo electoral de Nixon, in Boletín del Centro de Relaciones Internacionales, Number 25, 1972, pp. 1–3
 Ser judío en la Unión Soviética, in Boletín del Centro de Relaciones Internacionales, Number 26, 1973, pp. 1–6
 La Ostpolitik de López Bravo, in Boletín del Centro de Relaciones Internacionales, Number 27, 1973, pp. 14
 El mito del tercer mundo, in Boletín del Centro de Relaciones Internacionales, Number 28, 1973
 Theorie der Einflussbereiche, in Multitudo Legum Jus Unum, Berlin, 1973, pp. 537–554
 Zones of Influence, in The Year Book of World Affairs, 1973, (London), pp. 301–315
 La Tercera potencia mundial, in Línea (México), November–December, 1973, pp. 40
 Irán: un pueblo que se rejuvenece, in Pensamiento Político (Mexico), May 1975, pp. 19–32
 Federalismo y regionalismo: enfoques estático y dinámico, in Federalismo y regionalismo. Centro de Estudios Constitucionales, Madrid, 1979, pp. 429–445
 Estrategia global y desarme. Publicación preliminar in El Universal (México), September 5 to 12,  1980. In the press in "Reflexiones sobre el Mundo de Hoy", ENEP-ACATLAN, UNAM, Mexico
 La política exterior de México hacia los Estados Unidos: la lucha por la igualdad, in Las relaciones México-Estados Unidos Resultados de una investigación interdisciplinaria, UNAM, Mexico, 1981, pp. 263-297
 Algunas reflexiones sobre la humanidad en crisis, in Anuario Mexicano de relaciones internacionales, 1980, UNAM, Mexico, 1981, pp. 353-371
 Nuevo Orden Político Internacional y concepto de Intersoberanía. Preliminary publication in El Universal (México), July  22nd and 27th and August 4th 1981. Reproduced in Derecho y Orden Económico Internacional, ENEP-ACATLAN, UNAM, Mexico
 Self Determination and the Right to Leave, 12 Israel Yearbook on Human Rights (1982)
 La guerra nuclear, en Polémica (Barcelona), October, 1982, pp. 28-30. 90
 Autodeterminación y derecho de irse, in A.M.R.I., 1981, UNAM, Mexico, 1982, pp. 585-598
 ¿Habrá un mañana?, in AMRI. 1987, Mexico, pp. 499-508
 "Destruction of Food (for Economic Reasons) as a Crime Against Humanity", in Philip Ehrensaft and Fred Knelman (Editors), The Right to Food. Technology, Policy and Third World Agriculture, Montreal: Farma, 1987. pp. 179-185
 La crisis mundial y los Modelos de Sociedad Internacional, in Cursos de Derecho Internacional de Vitoria-Gasteiz, 1985, Universidad del País Vasco, 1986
 Las migraciones masivas, fenómeno de nuestro tiempo, in Audiencia pública. Trabajadores migratorios, Senado de la República, Universidad Nacional, Mexico, 1986, pp. 27-33
 La destrucción de alimentos (por razones económicas) como crimen contra la humanidad, in A.M.R.I., 1984, 1986
 Estrategia global y desarme, en Jurídica, 1985. Anuario del Departamento de Derecho de la Universidad Iberoamericana, Mexico
 El Asilo frente al Derecho Constitucional Mexicano, in El reto jurídico del Derecho de Asilo, Academia Mexicana de Derechos Humanos, El Colegio de México, Mexico, 1986
 La Organización de Naciones Unidas: Algunas reflexiones en torno a su valor actual, Intervenciones en la presentación del libro 40 años de presencia de México en las Naciones Unidas, Secretaría de Relaciones Exteriores, México, 1986, in Revista Mexicana de Política Exterior, Number 11, April–June, 1986
 Ocupación militar mutua.  Plan de acción para facilitar el desarme, in A.M.R.I., 1983, Mexico, 1986, pp. 577-593
 La Revolución mexicana a fin de siglo: una reflexión sobre el porvenir, in México: Revolución y Modernidad, ICAP-PRI, Mexico, 1987, pp. 331-346
 El principio  de interés común de la humanidad y el derecho  del mar, in Estudios en honor  del  Doctor Luis  Recasens  Siches,  Volume  II, UNAM, Mexico, 1987, pp. 643-650
 Democracia global  y paz, in  Congreso internacional sobre la paz, Volume II, UNAM, Mexico, 1987, pp. 863-870.
 El dilema de la humanidad: revolución total o entropía terminal, in A.M.R.I., 1985, Mexico, 1987, pp. 357-365
 Utopía realista vs. Realismo utópico: un llamamiento para la acción in A.M.R.I., 1986, Mexico, 1988
 Estrategias para el fortalecimiento de las instituciones  globales, in A.M.R.I., 1987, Mexico, 1988
 Hacia el Concepto de la Intersoberania, in Estudios en homenaje al Prof. José Pérez Montero, Universidad de Oviedo, 1988
 El Verdadero Sentido de la Democracia, in Línea, 1989
 El Exterior, in Diego Valadez and Mario Ruíz Massieu (coordinators), La Transformación del Estado Mexicano, Diana, 1989, pp. 231-246
 Los Objetivos de la Política Exterior Mexicana en el actual Contexto Internacional, in Instituto Matías Romero de Estudios Internacionales, Memoria del Foro de Consulta sobre los  Factores  Externos y el Contexto Internacional, SRE, Mexico, 1989, pp. 47-52
 América Latina y el Caribe, Frente a una Europa Unificada, in Rosario Green (Coordinator), Democracia y Recuperación Económica en América Latina, El Día en Libros, Mexico, 1990, pp. 45-57
 El Artículo 2. Párrafo 7 de la Carta y el concepto de intersoberanía, in A.M.R.I., 1988
 México ante un mundo cambiante, Presentation to the National Consultation Forum, organized by the Senate of the Republic, "Las Relaciones Comerciales de México con el Mundo", "Memoria" Senado de la República, Mexico, Volume III, pp. 90-95
 El asilo frente al derecho constitucional mexicano, in Relaciones Internacionales, Vol. XI, Number 46, September 1989, pp. 16-19
 National Factors Affecting International Relations Studies in Mexico, in Longin Pastusiak (Editor), National Context of International Relations Studies, Polish Institute of International Affairs, Varsovia, 1990, pp. 105-127
 La ONU: Rejuvenecimiento o Senilidad, in Universidad de México, August 1991, pp. 19-20
 Factores nacionales que afectan los estudios de las relaciones internacionales, in Estudios Jurídicos en Memoria de Alfonso Noriega Cantú,  Porrúa Editorial, Mexico, 1991, pp. 415-425
 La cuestión de la soberanía sobre las islas y el Golfo de  Fonseca, in Memoria del Congreso Internacional sobre Fronteras en Iberoamérica. Ayer y Hoy. Mexicali, B.C.: Universidad Autónoma de Baja California,  1990, pp.148-165
 La reglamentación jurídica del espacio, in México y la Astronomía, México: Cámara de  Diputados, 1994,  pp. 101-104
 El Consejo de Seguridad: ¿Crisis de madurez o enfermedad  terminal?, in Estudios en honor de Don César  Sepúlveda, Mexico, 1995
 Régimen Jurídico del Golfo de Fonseca, in Estudios jurídicos  en memoria de Eduardo García Maynez, Porrúa, Mexico, 1996, pp. 471-515
 The United Nations Security Council in 1995. Mid Age Crisis or Terminal Illness?, in Global Governance, ACUNS and United Nations University (Boulder, CO) Vol. 1, Number 2, 1996
 Prologue to Fernando Serrano Migallón, Isidro Fabela y la Diplomacia Mexicana, 2nd. Edition, Col. "Sepan Cuantos", Porrúa, 1997, pp. IX-XI
 Globalización e Interdependencia, in LiberAmicorum Héctor Fix Zamudio, Corte Interamericana de Derechos Humanos, San José de Costa  Rica, 1998, pp. 1389-1400
 La reglamentación internacional del medio marino, in María  del Carmen Rodríguez Hernández and Claudia Hernández Fernández, (Compilers), Océano: ¿Fuente inagotable de Recursos, UNAM-SEMARNAP, Mexico, 1999, pp. 423-450
 Gobernabilidad: Mitos y Realidades, in José Natividad González Parás, La Gobernabilidad Democrática en México, INAP, 2000, pp. 15-27
 La enseñanza del derecho internacional, in Jornadas de  derecho internacional 2001, OEA, Washington, 2002, pp. 453-462
 La discusión ociosa: No Intervención o Derecho de Injerencia, in Juan Carlos Velázquez Elizarrarás, Nuevos Desarrollos temáticos para el Estudio del Derecho Internacional, UNAM, 2004, pp. 13-30
 Factores, bases y fundamentos de  la Política Exterior de México, Prologue to Rafael Velázquez, Ed. Plaza & Valdés, Mexico, 2005
 Igor Libin, Jorge Pérez Peraza, Modesto Seara Vázquez and Olga Sizoba, Daroga v Buduchee (Rol Nauki, Tegnologuii i Obrasovanniya v EkonomikeRossii y Meksiki),Moskvá: Miesdunarodnaya Akademia Otsenki i Konsaltinga, 2009 (English version in 2011)
 Obrazovaterni Turism v  State Oaxaca.  Seara Vázquez, Modesto, O. V. Kurachenko, Igor Libin, V. Prodnakova Romeiko, Rodrigo Asaola and T. I. Pustovitova, in Eknonomika Ossiiv Usloviaj Mirovogo Krizica, MAOK, Moscow, 2009, pp. 83-99
 Sovremennie Problemi Vischei Schcoli Mexiki and Rossii. I.Libin, T. L. Oleinik, J. Pérez Peraza, M. Seara Vázquez, O.V. Sizova and  E.M. Treiguer, (Contemporary problems of higher education in Mexico and Russia) in Strateguicheskie Napravleniya Razvichiya Economiki v Usloviyaj Krizisa, RIO MAOK, Moscow, 2010, pp. 8-57
 Produktovioe Strateguii Naseleniya Biznesa i Gosudartsva v Usloviyaj Krizisa, I. Libin, E.M. Treiguer, Olga Sizoba, J. Pérez Peraza, M. Seara Vázquez and H. H.Hoffmann, in Strateguicheskie Napravleniya Razvichiya Economiki v Usloviyaj Krizisa, RIO MAOK, Moscow, 2010, pp. 180-217
 Distanzionno-OchnoeObuchenie b Universitete ‘NovaUniversitas’. MSV and Liubin, I. YA, J. García Matías,  T. L. Oleinik, P. Azevedo Luría, in Mesnudarodnii Jurnal Prokladnij i Fundamentalnij Issledobanii, Number 9, 2013, pp. 45-48
 Obrasobatelnaya, Issledobatelskaya i Kulturno-probeitelskaya Deyatelnost Sistemi Universitetov Stata Oaxaca s Sobremennij Usloviyaj. MSV y I. Ya. Liubin,, in Ekonomika Rossiib Usloviaj Modernisatzii: Problemi, Perspektivi, Rechaniya, Moskva: Miesdunarodnaya Akademia Otsenki i Konsaltinga, 2013, pp. 7-138
 Obuchenie Studentov b Robotizirobannoi Klinike Universiteta UNSIS.  M. Seara Vázquez et alia, in ActualnieSozialno-Ekonomicheskie Problemi Sobremennobo Mira: Nauka i Praktika,  Moskva: Miesdunarodnaya Akademia Otsenki i Konsaltinga, 2013, pp. 52-65
 El Jurista, in Lucía Saenz Viesca, Joaquín Diez-Canedo Flores and José Alejandro Vargas Castro (Coordinators), Presentation of Enrique Peña Nieto, Prologue of Emilio Chuayffet, Isidro Fabela. A 50 Años de su fallecimiento, Secretaría de Educación Pública, Mexico, 2014, pp. 93-125
 Prologue to Silvia Reyes Mora and Beatriz Carely Luna Olivera, (Editors), Modelación Matemática, Ingeniería, Economía, Biología y Ciencias Sociales, Huajuapan de León: Universidad Tecnológica de la Mixteca, 2016

Recognitions 
 Decoration of Aguila Azteca, Mexican Government, 1976
 Castelao Medal, Xunta de Galicia, 2011
 National Research Professor Emeritus, Consejo Nacional de Ciencia y Tecnología (CONACyT), 1997
 Honorary Engineer in Forestry, Madrid Polytechnical University, 2009
 Medal Donají, by the City of Oaxaca de Juárez, 2008
 Medal José López Alavez, by the City Council of Huajuapan de León, 1999
 Medal Antonio de León, by the City Council of Huajuapan de León, 1998
 Gold Medal to the Academic Merit,  National University of Mexico (UNAM), 2011
 Torres Bodet Prize, to the Internationalist of the Year, University of the Americas, Puebla, 1986
 Distinction "Gallego Universal", by the Organization Sexta Provincia, 2011
 Gold Key of the City Council of Tijuana, 1987
Citizen of Merit 2009, Consejo Estatal de Participación Ciudadana de Oaxaca A.C.
Award "Huaxuacac" 2004, from the Oaxacan Bar Association (Barra Oaxaqueña de Abogados y Pasantes de Derecho Independientes A.C.)                                                                  
 Honorary President of the  Mexican Association of International Studies, since 1993
 Award to the Educational and Cultural Merit,  Huatulco, 2005

Eponymous 
Plaza Modesto Seara, in the City of Allariz, since September 11, 2011

References

External links 

 Personal website
 Universidad Tecnológica de la Mixteca
 Universidad del Mar
 Universidad del Istmo
 Universidad del Papaloapan
 Universidad de la Sierra Sur
 Universidad de la Sierra Juárez
 Universidad de la Cañada
 NovaUniversitas

1931 births
Living people
Complutense University of Madrid alumni
People from Allariz – Maceda
Spanish academics
Academic staff of the National Autonomous University of Mexico
Academic staff of the Benito Juárez Autonomous University of Oaxaca